Cristóbal de Acebedo (born c. 1540) was a Spanish painter, active mainly during the Renaissance period.

He was born likely in Madrid and was a disciple of Bartolomé Carducho in 1585, and painted pictures for many of the convents in the capital.

References

16th-century Spanish painters
Spanish male painters
Spanish Renaissance painters
Year of death unknown
Year of birth unknown